Piastów  is a town in central Poland, near Warsaw, with 23,331 inhabitants (2006 est). It is situated in the Masovian Voivodship (since 1999); previously, it was in Warszawa Voivodship (1975–1998). With 3963 persons/km², it is the second most densely populated township in Poland (after Świętochłowice).

In the Middle Age, the villages of Żdżary and Utrata existed in the place of today's' Piastów. Piastów is served by Piastów railway station.

Cities and towns in Masovian Voivodeship
Pruszków County